Battle Point may refer to:

 Battle Point, Antarctica, a coastal headland on the east coast of Graham Land
 Battle Point, Bainbridge Island, Washington, a community of Bainbridge Island
 Battle Point Site, an archaeological site in Crockery Township, Ottawa County, Michigan